Janez Zavrl (born 25 December 1982) is a Slovenian footballer who plays for SV Egg.

Career
He has been capped four times for the Slovenian national team. Zavrl signed for Brann in 2006. In October 2006, Zavrl decided to return to Slovenia. Zavrl made seven Tippeligaen and three UEFA Cup appearances for Brann.

References

External links
Player profile at NZS 

1982 births
Living people
Footballers from Ljubljana
Slovenian footballers
Association football midfielders
NK Olimpija Ljubljana (1945–2005) players
NK Ljubljana players
NK Domžale players
Slovenian expatriate footballers
SK Brann players
Eliteserien players
Expatriate footballers in Norway
Slovenian expatriate sportspeople in Norway
NK IB 1975 Ljubljana players
NK Celje players
Slovenian PrvaLiga players
Slovenian Second League players
NK Ivančna Gorica players
NK Triglav Kranj players
Shenzhen F.C. players
NK Radomlje players
Chinese Super League players
Expatriate footballers in China
Expatriate footballers in Austria
Slovenian expatriate sportspeople in Austria
Slovenia youth international footballers
Slovenia under-21 international footballers
Slovenia international footballers
Slovenian expatriate sportspeople in China